Doc Kane is an American sound engineer. He has been nominated for four Academy Awards in the category Best Sound, and won Best Sound Editing at the 77th Academy Awards for The Incredibles. He has worked on nearly 500 films since 1984.

Selected filmography

Twilight Zone: The Movie (1983)
St. Elmo's Fire (1985)
The Little Mermaid (1989)
The Rescuers Down Under (1990)
 Beauty and the Beast (1991)
 Father of the Bride (1991)
 Aladdin (1992)
 Homeward Bound: The Incredible Journey (1993)
 Hocus Pocus (1993)
 The Flintstones (1994)
 The Lion King (1994)
 Color of Night (1994)
 A Goofy Movie (1995)
 Man of the House (1995)
 Pocahontas (1995)
 Toy Story (1995)
 Father of the Bride Part II (1995)
 Tom and Huck (1995)
 Homeward Bound II: Lost in San Francisco (1996)
 The Hunchback of Notre Dame (1996)
 101 Dalamatians (1996)
 Hercules (1997)
 George of the Jungle (1997)
 Flubber (1997)
 Mr. Magoo (1997)
 Deep Rising (1998)
 Quest for Camelot (1998)
 Mulan (1998)
 Tarzan (1999)
 Inspector Gadget (1999)
 The Iron Giant (1999)
 Toy Story 2 (1999)
 Dinosaur (2000)
 The Little Mermaid II: Return to the Sea (2000)
 Rugrats in Paris: The Movie (2000; uncredited)
 The Emperor's New Groove (2000)
 Atlantis: The Lost Empire (2001)
 Cats and Dogs (2001)
 The Majestic (2001)
 Lilo & Stitch (2002)
 Treasure Planet (2002)
 The Incredibles (2004)
 Pooh's Heffalump Movie (2005)
 The Pacifier (2005)
 Ratatouille (2007)
 Toy Story 3 (2010)
 Bridge of Spies (2015)
 The Good Dinosaur (2015)
 The SpongeBob Movie: Sponge Out of Water (2015)
 Doctor Strange (2016)
 Finding Dory (2016)
 Moana (2016)
 Rogue One: A Star Wars Story (2016)
 Zootopia (2016)
 Cars 3 (2017)
 Coco (2017)
 A Cure for Wellness (2017)
 The Post (2017)
 Star Wars: The Last Jedi (2017)
 Thor: Ragnarok (2017)
 Avengers: Infinity War (2018)
 Black Panther (2018)
 Incredibles 2 (2018)
 Ready Player One (2018)
 Solo: A Star Wars Story (2018)
 Avengers: Endgame (2019)
 Spider-Man: Far from Home (2019)
 Cruella (2021)
 Black Widow (2021)
 Shang-Chi and the Legend of the Ten Rings (2021)
 Eternals (2021)
 Clifford the Big Red Dog (2021)
 Spider-Man: No Way Home (2021)

References

External links

Year of birth missing (living people)
Living people
American audio engineers
Disney people
Pixar people
Walt Disney Animation Studios people